Guadalupe Pass may mean:

A mountain pass:
Guadalupe Pass (Texas) in Culberson County, Texas.
Guadalupe Pass (New Mexico) in Hidalgo County, New Mexico